Jaafar Muhammad an-Nimeiry (otherwise spelled in English as Jaafar Nimeiry, Gaafar Nimeiry or Ja'far Muhammad Numayri; ; 26 April 192830 May 2009) was a Sudanese politician who served as the president of Sudan from 1969 to 1985.

A military officer, he came to power after a military coup in 1969. Establishing a one-party state, with his Sudanese Socialist Union as the sole legal political entity in the country, Nimeiry pursued socialist and Pan-Arabist policies and close collaboration with Gamal Abdel Nasser of Egypt and Muammar Gaddafi of Libya. In 1971 Nimeiry survived a pro-Soviet coup attempt, after which he forged an alliance with Mao Zedong of China, and, eventually, with the United States as well.

In 1972 he signed the Addis Ababa Agreement, ending the First Sudanese Civil War. In his last years in power he also adopted aspects of Islamism, and in 1983 he imposed Sharia law throughout the country, precipitating the Second Sudanese Civil War. He was ousted from power in 1985 and went into exile in Egypt. He returned in 1999 and ran in the presidential elections in 2000, but did poorly.

Early life and education
Jaafar Nimeiry traced his lineage to the city of Dongola, one of the most important places where the Nubian tribes live and spread heavily in Northern Sudan. He was educated at the Omdurman primary and elementary school, then in Wad Madani secondary school, and finally in Hantub school that had a British colonial character. He then studied at Khartoum University College, but, as he desired a military career,  he eventually graduated from the War College in Omdurman in 1952. He also earned a Master of Military Science from Army Command and General Staff College in Fort Leavenworth, Kansas, United States in 1966.

Nimeiri moved on different positions in the Sudanese Army. He was accused in 1955 of orchestrating a coup d'état against the country's democratic system at that time, but there was lack of sufficient evidence to show that he was involved. He was interrogated again about a failed coup attempt led by an officer named Khalid Yusuf, but the investigation did not find anything to criminalize Nimeiry in the attempted coup.

On 28 December 1966, Lieutenant Hussein Osman with other young Communist officers tried to seize the presidential palace and the central post office, but failed. Among the 400 people arrested after the coup attempt failed was Colonel Gaafar Nimeiry, then commanding the Eastern Command. He was released on 9 January 1967 and transferred to command the infantry school.

1969–1980

Early years in power and socialist reforms

On 25 May 1969, together with four other officers, Colonel Nimeiry, commanding the Khartoum Garrison, overthrew the civilian government of Ismail al-Azhari, his coup being termed the "May Revolution". He created and chaired the Revolutionary Command Council (RCC). O'Ballance, writing in 1977, said that the 14 seniormost officers of the Sudanese Armed Forces were all out of the country at the time "either on official or private visits," so the "time chosen was opportune." On 26 May, he suspended the constitution, dissolved the Supreme Council, the National Assembly, and the Civil Service Commission, and ordered that all political parties disband. That day he also promoted himself to major-general, retired 22 serving officers, mostly senior to himself, dismissed over 30, and appointed 14 new officers to the most important posts.

Nimeiry became prime minister later, on 26 October 1969. He started a campaign aimed at reforming Sudan's economy through nationalization of banks and industries as well as some land reforms. He used his position to enact a number of socialist and Pan-Arabist reforms.

In March–April 1970 Nimeiry ordered an aerial bombardment on Aba Island which killed several thousand Ansar, members of the Umma Party which opposed him. O'Ballance writes that about 4,000 troops, plus tanks, stormed Aba Island on 30 March, supported by aircraft.

Later in 1971, he was elected President winning a referendum with 98.6 per cent of the votes. He then dissolved the RCC and founded the Sudanese Socialist Union which he declared to be the only legal political organization. In 1972 he signed the Addis Ababa Agreement whereby autonomy was granted to the non-Muslim southern region of Sudan, which ended the First Sudanese Civil War and ushered in an 11-year period of peace and stability to the region. In 1973 he drafted a new constitution which declared Sudan to be a democratic, socialist state and gave considerable power to the office of President.

Coup attempts and alliance with China and the West

Nimeiry successfully weathered a coup attempt by Sadiq al-Mahdi (a religious figure, Prime Minister 1966–67 and leader of the Islamic Umma Party) in 1970, and in 1971 was briefly removed from power by a Communist coup, before being restored. 
During the Communist coup, Nimeiry jumped out of the window of the place where he was incarcerated when his supporters came to the rescue.

After this coup, he started to move away from Soviet influence and began to receive arms from the US and Maoist China. In April 1972, he signed an agreement with China, by which Chinese military advisers began training the Sudanese Army, and further providing for Chinese sale of MiG-19 fighter aircraft; Mao Zedong also provided Sudan with interest-free loans, and Chinese state companies began work on constructing a number of public works in Sudan, including factories, roads, bridges and conference centers. Sudanese collaboration with China continued even after Nimeiry was overthrown in 1985.

In late 1975, a military coup by Communist members of the armed forces, led by Brigadier Hassan Hussein Osman, failed to remove Nimeiry from power. General Elbagir, Nimeiry's deputy, led a counter coup that brought Nimeiry back within few hours. Brigadier Osman was wounded and later court martialed and executed.

In the mid-1970s, he launched several initiatives to develop agriculture and industry in Sudan and he invited foreign Western and Chinese companies to explore for oil. (Chevron would discover oil reserves in South-Central Sudan in 1979.)
In general he began a more moderate economic policy, where some banks and industries were returned to private ownership (although the state was still in control of much of the economy) and foreign investment was encouraged, as evidenced by a number of bilateral investment treaties: with the Netherlands 22 August 1970, Switzerland 17 February 1974, Egypt 28 May 1977, and France 31 July 1978. In July 1978 at the Organisation of African Unity (OAU) summit in Khartoum, Nimeiry was elected Chairman of the OAU until July 1979.

In 1976, a force of one thousand insurgents under Sadiq al Mahdi, armed and trained by Libya, crossed the border from Ma'tan as-Sarra.  After passing through Darfur and Kordofan, the insurgents engaged in three days of house-to-house fighting in Khartoum and Omdurman that killed some 3000 people and sparked national resentment against the Libyan leader Muammar al-Gaddafi.  Nimeiry and his government were narrowly saved after a column of army tanks entered the city. Ninety-eight people implicated in the plot were executed.

National Reconciliation
In 1977, a National Reconciliation took place between Sadiq al Mahdi, the leader of the opposition who was based abroad, and Nimeiry. A limited measure of pluralism was allowed and Sadiq al Mahdi and members of the Democratic Unionist Party (Sudan) joined the legislature under the umbrella of the Sudan Socialist Union. Hassan al-Turabi, an Islamist leader who had been imprisoned and then exiled after the May Revolution, was invited back and became Justice Minister and Attorney General in 1979. Relations between Khartoum and the South Sudan leadership worsened after the National Reconciliation and the National Reconciliation itself came to a premature end in light of disagreements between the opposition and Nimeiry.

1980–1985

Second term as president

Nimeiry was one of only two Arab leaders (the other being Qaboos of Oman) who maintained close relations with Anwar Sadat after the Camp David Accords of 1978. He attended Sadat's funeral in 1981.

In 1981, Nimeiry, pressured by his Islamic opponents, and still President of Sudan, began a dramatic shift toward Islamist political governance and allied himself with the Muslim Brotherhood. In 1983, he declared an "Islamic revolution" and imposed Sharia, or Islamic law, throughout the country. Additionally, he attempted to have himself declared Imam of the Sudanese ummah, but failed. To show his dedication to Sharia, he poured $11 million worth of alcohol into the Nile. The state-wide declaration of Sharia law alienated the predominantly Christian and animist south. In violation of the Addis Ababa Agreement he dissolved the southern Sudanese government and reformed the administrative boundaries of the south into 3 smaller regions to correspond with the pre-1972 provinces that the south was governed under.  This prompted the start of the Second Sudanese Civil War. In 1984 he declared a state of emergency, giving special powers to the military. In 1985 Nimeiry authorised the execution of the peaceful yet controversial political dissident and Islamic reformist Mahmoud Mohamed Taha after Taha — who was first accused of religious sedition in the 1960s when Sudan's President was Ismail al-Azhari — had been declared an apostate by a Sudanese court.The alliance with the United States was strengthened under the administration of Ronald Reagan. American aid increased from $5 million in 1979 to $200 million in 1983 and then to $254 million in 1985, mainly for military programs. Sudan thus becomes the second largest recipient of US aid to Africa (after Egypt). The construction of four air bases to house Rapid Deployment Force units and a powerful listening station for the CIA near Port Sudan is decided.

In 1984 and 1985, after a period of drought, several million people were threatened by famine, particularly in western Sudan. The government tried to hide the situation internationally.

Inflation
During 1980–85, the Sudanese Pound lost 80 percent of its value due to inflation and renewed civil war.

1985 Revolution

Political and economic discontent against Nimeiry grew over several years prior to 1985, according to Sudanese interviewed by The New York Times, who said that Nimeiry had "begun to alienate almost every sector of Sudanese society". Major complaints included the obligatory use of Islamic law throughout Sudan, which upset non-Muslims, especially in the southern part of Sudan, and price increases resulting from an economic austerity program implemented under pressure from the United States (US) and the International Monetary Fund (IMF). Price increases in late March 1985 were considered to be a major trigger factor for protests. Eight doctors', lawyers' and university lecturers' associations called for a protest on 3 April and a "general political strike until the abolition of the current regime". Massive demonstrations took place in Khartoum and around Sudan on 3 April. The general strike took place up to 6 April, when Nimeiry was deposed, with a high effectiveness in shutting down governance of Sudan. The use of massive civil disobedience that led to the coup d'état deposing Nimeiry from the presidency on 6 April is often referred to as the 1985 Revolution that followed the Sudanese October 1964 Revolution.

Exile and return
On 6 April 1985, while Nimeiry was on an official visit to the United States of America in the hope of gaining more financial aid from Washington, a bloodless military coup led by his defence minister Gen. Abdel Rahman Swar al-Dahab ousted him from power. At the subsequent elections the pro-Islamist leader, Sadiq al-Mahdi (who had attempted a coup against Nimeiry in 1976) became Prime Minister.

Nimeiry lived in exile in Egypt from 1985 to 1999, in a villa situated in Heliopolis, Cairo. He returned to Sudan in May 1999 to a rapturous welcome that surprised many of his detractors. The next year, he ran in the presidential election against incumbent president Omar al-Bashir, but did poorly, obtaining only 9.6% of the votes in elections that were boycotted by the Sudanese opposition and alleged to be rigged. In 2005, Nimeiry's party, the Alliance of the Peoples' Working Forces signed a merger agreement with the ruling National Congress of Sudan. The National Congress negotiated an end to the Second Sudanese civil war that was signed in a Comprehensive Peace Agreement on 9 January 2005.

Nimeiry died of natural causes in his home in Omdurman on 30 May 2009. Tens of thousands turned up to his official funeral including members of Sudan's political forces that had opposed his rule. After Nimeiry's death in May 2009, former Revolutionary Command Council member Khaled Hassan Abbass was elected head of the Alliance of Peoples' Working Forces. Splits occurred amongst the supporters of Nimeiry with some endorsing the partnership with the National Congress and others alleging that the National Congress reneged on the merger agreement and did not properly implement it. The splinter groups formed the May Socialist Union which took part in the parliamentary elections in Sudan in 2010. Another group led by Professor Dr. Fatima Abdel Mahmoud set up the Sudanese Socialist Democratic Union Partu as the successor party of the Sudanese Socialist Union. Abdel Mahmoud was the first woman cabinet Minister in Sudan in the 1970s, and the first Sudanese woman to contest the presidency in the 2010 Sudanese election.

References

External links 
 

Presidents of Sudan
Prime Ministers of Sudan
Foreign ministers of Sudan
1928 births
2009 deaths
Sudanese Socialist Union politicians
National Congress Party (Sudan) politicians
Leaders who took power by coup
Leaders ousted by a coup
Sudanese anti-communists
Non-U.S. alumni of the Command and General Staff College
People from Omdurman
Sudanese Arab nationalists
Exiled Sudanese politicians
People of the Cold War
Muslim socialists
Politicide perpetrators
Recipients of orders, decorations, and medals of Sudan